Kota Tinggi Waterfalls is a waterfall in Kota Tinggi, Johor, Malaysia. The waterfalls are located in Lombong at the foot of Gunung (Mountain) Muntahak.

See also
 Geography of Malaysia

References

External links 
 Tourism Malaysia - Kota Tinggi Waterfall
 Kota Tinggi Falls

Kota Tinggi District
Landforms of Johor
Waterfalls of Malaysia